is a Japanese political scientist and scholar of China who has published widely on China's involvement in peacekeeping operations. She is currently RCUK Research Fellow at the School of Politics and International Relations at the University of Nottingham and a visiting fellow at the Department of International Relations at the Australian National University. Her PhD research at the Australian National University concerned the work of religious NGOs in China, and formed the basis of the book Civilizing missions: international religious agencies in China.

Hirono became the subject of a visa controversy after the UK Home Office retroactively applied a rule concerning the amount of time a temporary resident could spend overseas to deny her the right to remain in Britain, leading her to accept a position at the Kyoto University of Foreign Studies in her native Japan. This decision was widely criticized by higher education practitioners as undermining Britain's ability to attract and retain highly skilled foreign scholars.

Selected publications
 HIRONO, M., 2008. Civilizing missions: international religious agencies in China Palgrave MacMillan.
 HIRONO, M. and LANTEIGNE, M., 2011. China and United Nations Peacekeeping International Peacekeeping. 18(3), 328-43
 HIRONO, M., 2011. China's charm offensive and peacekeeping: the lessons of Cambodia for Sudan - what now for Sudan? International Peacekeeping. 18(3), 328-343
 HIRONO, M., 2012. "Competing for International Prestige"?: Chinese and Japanese Contributions to the United Nations Transitional Authority in Cambodia (UNTAC). In: LAM, PENG ER and TEO, VICTOR, eds., Southeast Asia between China and Japan Cambridge Scholars Publishing.

References

People associated with the University of Nottingham
Academic staff of Kyoto University of Foreign Studies
Living people
Year of birth missing (living people)
Keio University alumni
Australian National University alumni